In mathematics and its applications, a parametric family or a parameterized family is a family of objects (a set of related objects) whose differences depend only on the chosen values for a set of parameters.

Common examples are parametrized (families of) functions, probability  distributions, curves, shapes, etc.

In probability and its applications

For example, the probability density function  of a random variable  may depend on a parameter . In that case, the function may be denoted  to indicate the dependence on the parameter .  is not a formal argument of the function as it is considered to be fixed. However, each different value of the parameter gives a different probability density function. Then the parametric family of densities is the set of functions , where  denotes the parameter space, the set of all possible values that the parameter  can take. As an example, the normal distribution is a family of similarly-shaped distributions parametrized by their mean and their variance.

In decision theory, two-moment decision models can be applied when the decision-maker is faced with random variables drawn from a location-scale family of probability distributions.

In algebra and its applications

In economics, the Cobb–Douglas production function is a family of production functions parametrized by the elasticities of output with respect to the various factors of production.

In algebra, the quadratic equation, for example, is actually a family of equations parametrized by the coefficients of the variable and of its square and by the constant term.

See also
Indexed family

References

Mathematical terminology
Theory of probability distributions